Kuk is a Grassfields Bantu language of Cameroon.

Proposed Kumfutu language
In the late 1980s and early 1990s, some people from the village of Kumfutu (traditionally an ethnic Kuk village) were discontent with Kuk leadership and founded the Kumfutu Student Association as a result. The peopole of Kumfutu wanted to become independent from the Kuk, and thus proposed a new "Kumfutu" language. However, by 2010, the people of Kumfutu were no longer in conflict with the Kuk leadership.

The case of Kumfutu serves as an example of how language change in Africa often closely linked to the need for ethnic differentation.

References

Ring languages
Languages of Cameroon